Anderson Township is one of ten townships in Warrick County, Indiana, United States. As of the 2010 census, its population was 1,274 and it contained 500 housing units.

History
Southern Anderson Township is the location of the Yankeetown site, an important archaeological site from the Woodland and Mississippian periods.

Anderson Township was established in 1813. The township was named for Bailey Anderson, a pioneer settler.

Geography

Cities, towns, villages
 Newburgh (east edge)

Unincorporated towns
 Dayville at 
 Red Brush at 
 Vanada at 
 Yankeetown at 
(This list is based on USGS data and may include former settlements.)

Adjacent townships
 Boon Township (north)
 Luce Township, Spencer County (east)
 Ohio Township (northwest)

Cemeteries
The township contains Bates Hill Cemetery.

Rivers
 Ohio River

Lakes
 Collins Lake

School districts
 Warrick County School Corporation

Political districts
 Indiana's 8th congressional district
 State House District 74
 State House District 78
 State Senate District 47
 State Senate District 50

References
 
 United States Census Bureau 2007 TIGER/Line Shapefiles
 IndianaMap

External links
 Indiana Township Association
 United Township Association of Indiana

Townships in Warrick County, Indiana
Townships in Indiana